Gravesend Sailing Club was established in 1894, and is believed to be the oldest sailing club on the lower part of the River Thames.

The club is a Royal Yachting Association establishment, and as such it offers a range of courses, from Dinghy stage one to First Aid certificates.

Gravesend is a family club, whose aim is to provide a hobby for everyone, whether they own a boat or not. Social events are frequent and the club hosts an annual prize-giving and dinner.

References

External links
Gravesend Sailing Club

Gravesend, Kent
Yacht clubs in England
Sport on the River Thames
1894 establishments in England